ThSV Eisenach is a German handball club from Eisenach, Germany, that plays in the 2. Handball-Bundesliga.

Crest, colours, supporters

Kits

External links
Official website

German handball clubs
Eisenach